DXMC (1026 AM) Bombo Radyo is a radio station owned and operated by Bombo Radyo Philippines through its licensee People's Broadcasting Service. Its studio and transmitter are located at Bombo Radyo Broadcast Center, KM 4, General Santos Dr., Koronadal. The station operates daily from 4:30 AM to 9:30 PM.

References

External links
 Bombo Radyo Koronadal Website

Radio stations in South Cotabato
Radio stations established in 1995
News and talk radio stations in the Philippines